"The Parson's Tale" seems, from the evidence of its prologue, to have been intended as the final tale of Geoffrey Chaucer's poetic cycle The Canterbury Tales. The "tale", which is the longest of all the surviving contributions by Chaucer's pilgrims, is in fact neither a story nor a poem, but a long and unrelieved prose treatise on penance. Critics and readers are generally unclear what rhetorical effect Chaucer may have intended by ending his cycle in this unlikely, extra-generic fashion.

Framing narrative 

In the prologue to the tale, the host asks the Parson for a fable (the form used earlier with such apparent success by the Nun's Priest) but the Parson refuses with a round condemnation of fable stories, saying instead that he will tell an improving tale in prose since he can neither rhyme nor alliterate. It is also of interest that the host seems to be in some doubt as to the identity of the Parson, since he asks him to introduce himself:

"Sire preest," quod he,, "artow a vicary?
Or arte a person? Sey, sooth, by thy fey!
Be what thou be, ne breke thou nat oure pley;
For every man, save thou, hath toold his tale.
("Parson's Prologue", lines 22–25)

Some idea of Chaucer's intended structure for the Canterbury Tales may be gleaned from this "final" prologue. The host speaks of al myn ordinaunce (being) almoost fulfild and says that the company lakketh...no tales mo than oon. Since known tales do not exist for all of the pilgrims, and since none reach the projected total of four tales each outlined in the "General Prologue", the host's remarks give a further indication of the way in which Chaucer's ultimate scheme for the cycle either was not realised or has not survived.

The Tale

The subject of the parson's "tale" (or rather, treatise) is penitence. It may thus be taken as containing inferential criticism of the behaviour and character of humanity detectable in all the other pilgrims, knight included. Chaucer himself claims to be swayed by the plea for penitence, since he follows the Parson's Tale with a Retraction (the conceit which appears to have been the intended close to the entire cycle) in which he personally asks forgiveness for any offences he may have caused and (perhaps) for ever having deigned to write works of worldly vanitee at all (line 1085).

The parson divides penitence into three parts; contrition of the heart, confession of the mouth, and satisfaction. The second part about confession is illustrated by referring to the Seven Deadly Sins and offering remedies against them. The Seven Deadly Sins are pride, envy, wrath, sloth, greed, gluttony, and lust; they are "healed" by the virtues of humility, contentment, patience, fortitude, mercy, moderation, and chastity.

Chaucer's text seems for the most part to be a combination, in English translation, of the texts of two Latin works on penitence popular at the time; the Summa casuum poenitentiae of Raymond of Peñafort, and the Summa vitiorum of William Perault. This is mingled with fragments from other texts. It is not known whether Chaucer was the first to combine these particular sources, or whether he translated an existing combined edition, possibly from French. If the latter is the case, any direct source has been lost.

Character of the Parson 

The Parson is considered by some to be the only good member of the clergy in The Canterbury Tales, while others have detected ambiguities and possible hints of Lollardy in the portrait. Chaucer, in the General Prologue calls him a povre Persoun of a Toun. His depiction of a man who practices what he preaches seems to be positive:

He was a shepherde and noght a mercenarie.
And thogh he hooly were and vertuous,
He was to synful men nat despitous,
Ne of his speche daungerous ne digne,
But in his techyng discreet and benynge.
(Lines 514–518)

if also rather forbidding; for instance, Chaucer's parson is no respecter of persons in demanding ultimate adherence to moral principles:

But it were any person obstinat,
What so he were, of heigh or lough estat,
Hym wolde he snybben sharply for the nonys.
(Lines 521–523)

None of the explicit criticism of clergy that marks many of the other tales and character sketches is obvious here. The Parson is throughout depicted as a sensible and intelligent person. Chaucer is not uncritical of other clergy; in the paragraph headed "Lat us now touche the vice of flateryng", he describes flatterers – those who continuously sing placebo – as "develes chapelleyns".

Notes and references

External links 
"The Parson's Prologue and Tale", middle-english hypertext with glossary and side-by-side middle english and modern english
"Parson's Tale" retold in Modern English prose

Parson's Prologue and Tale
Seven deadly sins in popular culture